The 2008–09 Biathlon World Cup/Individual Women started at Thursday December 4, 2008 in Östersund and finished Wednesday March 11, 2009 in Vancouver at the pre-Olympic biathlon event. The defending titlist was Martina Beck of Germany.

Competition format
The format consists of a 15 kilometre (9.3 mi) individual race and is the oldest biathlon event; the distance is skied over five laps. The biathlete shoots four times at any shooting lane, in the order of prone, standing, prone, standing, totalling 20 targets. For each missed target a fixed penalty time, usually one minute, is added to the skiing time of the biathlete. Competitors' starts are staggered, normally by 30 seconds.

2007–2008 Top 3 Standings

Medal winners

Final standings

References

Biathlon World Cup - Individual Women, 2008-09